The Movement for Development by Culture is a political party in Benin. 
At the legislative elections, 30 March 2003, the party was member of the Presidential Movement, the alliance of supporters of Mathieu Kérékou, who had won the 2001 presidential elections,. It took part in a combined list of the Movement for Development by Culture, the Party of Salvation and the Congress of People for Progress, that won 2 out of 83 seats.

Political parties in Benin
Political parties with year of establishment missing